The  (abbreviated JSC) is an educational institution administered by the Ministry of Defense's Joint Staff Office. Established in August 1961, it provides post-National Defense Academy of Japan education and professional training to officers.

References

External links

Japan Self-Defense Forces
Military academies of Japan
Educational institutions established in 1961
1961 establishments in Japan